Hydyr Saparlyev, born 1958, is a Turkmen politician. He was deputy chairman of the Cabinet of Ministers of Turkmenistan. In 1982, he graduated from the Turkmen Polytechnic Institute in engineering and obtained a master's degree in technical sciences. In 2004, he was appointed minister of education of Turkmenistan and as of October 2005, ambassador of Turkmenistan to Armenia. In February 2007, he was re-appointed minister of education of Turkmenistan. On 16 March 2007 he was appointed deputy chair of the Cabinet of Ministers for education, science, health, culture, sports, and mass media.  He held that position until 11 February 2011.

References

1958 births
Living people
Ambassadors of Turkmenistan to Armenia
Education ministers of Turkmenistan
People from Mary, Turkmenistan
Date of birth missing (living people)